Cham Anar, also rendered as Cham Nar, may refer to:
 Cham Anar-e Sofla
 Cham Anar-e Sofla